While You Were Sleeping is a 2011 South Korean television series starring Lee Chang-hoon, Choi Won-young, Oh Yoon-ah and Lee Young-eun. The daily drama aired on SBS on Mondays to Fridays at 19:15 from May 16 to November 9, 2011 for 120 episodes.

Plot
Oh Shin-young (Lee Young-eun) is a hospital cafeteria nutritionist with a bright personality, who is happily married to Yoon Min-joon (Choi Won-young), who works in the sales department of a food company. But while giving birth, Shin-young falls into a vegetative state induced by the hospital's chief obstetrician Go Hyun-sung (Oh Yoon-ah). Hyun-sung is Min-joon's ex-girlfriend who is still in love with him, despite being married to Chae Hyuk-jin (Lee Chang-hoon), the director of a food company and Min-joon's boss. When Hyuk-jin learns of his wife's betrayal, he plans his revenge.

Cast
Main characters
Lee Chang-hoon as Chae Hyuk-jin
Choi Won-young as Yoon Min-joon
Oh Yoon-ah as Go Hyun-sung
Lee Young-eun as Oh Shin-young

Hyuk-jin's family
Jung Dong-hwan as Chae Dae-pil
Park Joon-geum as Mrs. Jang
Baek Min-hyun as Chae Woo-jin
Kim Jin-woo  as Chae Hwan-hee

Min-joon's family
Kim Ha-kyun as Yoon Hwang-goo
Song Ok-sook as Na Pil-boon
Lee Sung-yeol as Yoon So-joon

Hyun-sung's family
Kim Hak-chul as Go Kyung-ho
Ahn Hae-sook as Lee Hye-ja

Shin-young's family
Kang Ye-sol as Oh Shin-hye
Lee Duk-hee as Shin Sook-hee

Extended cast
Ahn Ji-hyun as Maeng Hyun-joo
Min Joon-hyun as Chae Dae-pil's secretary
Lee Bum-hak as Bum-goo
Park Woo-chun

Awards and nominations

References

External links
While You Were Sleeping official SBS website 

Seoul Broadcasting System television dramas
2011 South Korean television series debuts
2011 South Korean television series endings
Korean-language television shows
South Korean romance television series
South Korean melodrama television series
Television series by Story TV